Assembly is a 2015 South Korean television series starring Jung Jae-young, Song Yoon-ah and Ok Taec-yeon. It airs on KBS2 on  Wednesdays and Thursdays at 21:55 for 20 episodes beginning July 15, 2015.

Plot
Jin Sang-pil has been a shipyard welder for 23 years, but when he and his fellow workers get laid off, he fights for their reinstatement as the spokesman for the labor union. To his surprise, this leads to him becoming a newly elected member of the National Assembly. But because of his idealism and naiveté, Sang-pil finds it difficult to navigate the corridors of politics. Enter whip-smart aide Choi In-kyung, who shows him the ropes and together they work to accomplish real change within the government.

Cast
Jung Jae-young as Jin Sang-pil
Song Yoon-ah as Choi In-kyung
Ok Taec-yeon as Kim Kyu-hwan
Jang Hyun-sung as Baek Do-hyun
Park Yeong-gyu as Park Choon-sub
Kim Seo-hyung as Hong Chan-mi
Lee Won-jae as Kang Sang-ho
Jung Hee-tae as Im Kyu-tae
Choi Jin-ho as Jo Woong-kyu
Gil Hae-yeon as Chun No-shim
Sung Ji-ru as Byun Sung-ki
Yoon Bok-in as Oh Ae-ri
Seo Hyun-chul as Seo Dong-jae
Im Ji-kyu as Shim Dong-chun
Kim Bo-mi as Song So-min
Kang Ye-won  as Park Da-jung
Son Byong-ho as Bae Dal-soo
Lee Hang-na as Kim Kyung-ah
Kim Ji-min as Jin Joo-hee
Cho Jae-hyun (cameo, episode 1)
Tae In-ho

Ratings
In the table below,  represent the lowest ratings and  represent the highest ratings.

Awards and nominations

Production
This is Jung Jae-young's first Korean drama series in his prolific career as a film and stage actor.

Prior to becoming a drama screenwriter, Jung Hyun-min worked for ten years as a political aide for a member of the National Assembly.

References

External links
  
 
 

2015 South Korean television series debuts
2015 South Korean television series endings
Korean Broadcasting System television dramas
South Korean political television series
Television series by RaemongRaein
Television series by KBS Media